Kuttram Kuttrame is a 2022 Indian Tamil-language crime thriller film written and directed by Suseenthiran and produced by D Company and presented by Axess Film Factory. The film stars Jai in the lead role with a supporting cast including Bharathiraja, Harish Uthaman, Smruthi Venkat and Dhivya Duraisamy. The film's music is composed by Ajesh, with cinematography handled by R. Velraj and editing done by Kasi Viswanathan. The film was released as a television premiere directly via Kalaignar TV on 14 April 2022 coinciding with Tamil New Year.

Plot 

The film begins with a schoolgirl falling in a river and dying on March 9, 2005. The story then shifts to March 5, 2021, where a schoolgirl meets with a car accident and is admitted in a hospital. There, the doctor says there is no hope to save the girl and to prays to God. 

Then, the story shifts to the morning of March 20, 2020. Kokila is found unconscious, and her husband Eeshwaran takes her to the hospital. Doctors announce Kokila's death due to an overdose of sleeping pills, but her uncle, SI Naatrayan, believes this to be a murder, and Kokila's parents believe Eeshwaran is innocent.

In Naatrayan's investigation, it is revealed that both Eeshwaran and Kokila had been fighting with each other and he hit her brutally. There was also a rumor that Eeshwaran is having an affair with his niece Priya and they both stayed together in a lodge for an entire night. During the investigation, it is also shown that Priya was trying to hide something from Naatrayan and burns some medical reports which Naatrayan ends up seeing. Based on this information, he concludes that Eeshwaran and Priya murdered Kokila so that they can be together and Eeshwaran married Kokila for her wealth. Naatrayan shows all the evidence he has collected to Kokila's parents. Kokila's mother believes this claim and gives a complaint to Naatrayan.

DSP Muthukaruppan starts investigating and finds that Eeshwaran's uncle wanted him to take care of managing the farmlands owned by him. After seeing his diligence, he wants his daughter Kokila to get married to Eeshwaran so that relationships are maintained. Both Eeshwaran and Kokila loved each other, then got married, living a seemingly happy life. But Priya and Kokila were not on good terms with each other due to possessiveness on Eeshwaran. During Kokila's pregnancy, this fight reaches a point where Kokila's parents came to mediate it with Eeshwaran and suggest that shifting Priya to Coimbatore would be helpful for her studies and resolve this issue. Eeshwaran has already suggested this to Priya, but she is not willing to move out the house as from a young age, she wanted to marry Eeshwaran. However, she was heartbroken when he married Kokila and states her only happiness is him and to let her stay at his house. 

Understanding the situation, Kokila's parents try to take Kokila with them for a few days for her peace of mind. With no choice, Eeshwaran takes Priya to a lodge and stays there, then met with Kokila's parents about the issue. It is also revealed that Kokila accidentally killed her child since she had problems with her breast milk secretion and someone suggested to Kokila that eating apple seed paste will help her. But by mistake, she fed it to her baby, who died. Kokila was depressed, and during an argument with her husband, he slapped her, causing a head injury. Priya took her to the hospital without Eeshwaran's knowledge, and those are the medical records she burned at the start since it might make Eeshwaran look suspicious.

Meanwhile, Naatrayan is enraged by the verdict. He gets drunk and kidnaps Priya, still believing she is the murderer. Later, he tries to hang her and explains that he can convince the village that she committed suicide due to the guilt of killing Kokila. A fight ensues between Naatrayan and Eeshwaran, and it is revealed that Naatrayan is also at blame for Kokila's suicide. Kokila pushed her childhood friend Chitra from a bridge into a river below accidentally over a small fight. Naatrayan tells to cover it up and hide it from everyone. As Kokila's child dies on the same day Chitra died, she believes it is God's punishment and the guilt was part of the reason why she died. 

A few months later, Muthu meets Eeshwaran and asks who suggested to use apple seed paste in the first place. When Chitra was pushed, Naatrayan's friend witnessed this too and blackmailed Naatrayan for money to keep his mouth shut. Recently, in a small argument, Naatrayan blackmails his friend, who decides to tell the truth to Muthu, Chitra's brother. Enraged, he decides to kill Kokila, but unexpectedly, her child died. Eeshwaran states he did not take revenge against Muthu as his mother already lost a child and he has a family, but he mentions that Muthu will definitely get his karma. Later, it is revealed that the girl who met with the car accident at the start was Muthu's daughter. Muthu commits suicide and hopes God will save his daughter.

Cast

Soundtrack 
The soundtrack and score is composed by Ajesh and the album featured two songs. The audio rights were acquired by Think Music.

Reception 
Avinash Ramachandran of Cinema Express praised the film and wrote that "With multiple stories being narrated one after the other, it is up to Jai and Harish Uthaman to hold the film together, and both of them do a commendable job of it".           S Subhakeerthana  Critic from OTTplay noted that " The biggest flaw of Kuttrame Kuttram is its pace. It's slow in several places, but I think it's forgivable. "gave 3 out of 5 rating.

References

External links 
 

Crime television films
Films directed by Suseenthiran
Indian crime thriller films
Indian television films